The 1919 Detroit Titans football team was an American football team that represented the University of Detroit as an independent during the 1919 college football season. Detroit shut out five of its nine opponents, outscored all opponents by a combined total of 257 to 30, and finished with an 8–1 record.

James F. Duffy, who had led the team to an 8–1 record in 1917, rejoined the team as head coach after having served in the United States Navy during World War I. James M. "Bingo" Brown was the assistant football coach and also served as head coach of the basketball, track, and baseball teams. William A. Reid, formerly of Colgate, was the athletic director.

In an effort to place the Titans "on the national college football map", the school scheduled three games for 1919 against "three important teams from the east"—Georgetown, Tufts, and Holy Cross. The Titans won two of those three games.

Several players from the 1919 University of Detroit football team later played in National Football League, including end Walt Clago, halfbacks Eddie Moegle and Tip O'Neill, and tackle Tillie Voss.

The team conducted its pre-season practice sessions at the athletic field on Belle Isle. An alumni committee then arranged for further practice sessions and the team's home games to be played at Navin Field, which was also the home field for the Detroit Tigers baseball team.

Schedule

Roster
The players on the Titans' 1919 football team included the following:
 Francis Bowler, 5'8", 165 pounds - halfback
 Joe Brennan, 5'10", 156 pounds - quarterback
 Warren Brennan, 5'11", 172 pounds - end
 Walt Clago, 6', 181 pounds - end
 John Curtain, 5'9", 158 pounds - fullback
 Walter "Speed" Ellis, 5'11", 200 pounds - tackle
 F. Fitzgerald, 5'10", 185 pounds - halfback and captain
 Martin Gormley - 6', 210 pounds - guard
 Peter Hampston, 6', 165 pounds - quarterback
 Thomas Hogan, 6'2", 180 pounds - tackle
 Lauren A. Howe, 5'10", 160 pounds - halfback
 Frances Kane, 5'10", 155 pounds - end
 Thomas A. Kenney, 5'10", 170 pounds - center
 Edward Larkin 6', 180 pounds - tackle
 Harold S. "Dutch" Lauer, 5'10", 175 pounds - fullback
 Hansen Loving,5'8", 160 pounds  - halfback
 Eddie Moegle, 5'9", 159 pounds - halfback
 Tip O'Neill, 5'10", 157 pounds - halfback
 Percy Prey, 6'1", 177 pounds - guard/tackle
 Claude Seitz, 5'10", 158 pounds - fullback
 Tillie Voss, 6'1", 190 pounds - guard/tackle

References

External links
 1919 University of Detroit football programs

Detroit
Detroit Titans football seasons
Detroit Titans football
Detroit Titans football